Ferrocarril Central Andino (FCCA) is the consortium which operates the Ferrovías Central railway in Peru linking the Pacific port of Callao and the capital Lima with Huancayo and Cerro de Pasco. As one of the Trans-Andean Railways it is the second highest in the world constructed by the Polish engineer Ernest Malinowski in 1871–1876.

After a period of operation by the nationalized entity Empresa Nacional de Ferrocarriles del Perú (ENAFER), in July 1999 the government awarded a divisible consortium led by Railroad Development Corporation (RDC) of Pittsburgh, and Lorenzo Sousa's Peruval Corp who was awarded the South and South east railways, a concession to operate the former Ferrocarril del Centro for 30 years. Investors in Ferrocarril Central Andino include RDC, Juan Olaechea & Company, Minas Buenaventura, ADR Inversiones, and Inversiones Andino.

Route 

The line starts at the port city of Callao and goes through Lima and the Desamparados station parallel to the Rímac River.  It crosses into Junín state via the Galera Tunnel, the second highest railroad tunnel in the world. It reaches La Oroya, where it splits in two: the southern branch goes to Huancayo, while the northern branch (previously a line operated by a mining company) goes into Pasco region, through Cerro de Pasco (the regional capital) to the Goyllarisquizga coal mines.  Formerly a branch split off at Cerro de Pasco and ran into Pachitea Province in Huánuco region. There are 27 stations.

In June 2006, the Peruvian government agreed that FCCA should go ahead with converting the  gauge Ferrocarril Huancayo - Huancavelica to  gauge.  Estimated to take 16 months, the US$33m project was to be funded jointly by the government and the Development Bank of Latin America. This project was finished by October 2010.

History 

In 1851, engineer Ernest Malinowski proposed to extend the newly opened Lima to Callao railroad as far as the valley of Jauja. Malinowski, a Polish expatriate, was voluntarily exiled in Peru by political problems in his country, occupied at that time by Germany, Russia and Austria.

The government commissioned Felipe Barreda, Mariano Felipe Paz Soldán, and Manuel Marrón to report in detail on the project. This commission devised a detailed plan for the railroad which, after approval by the Peruvian Congress, was integrated with the Malinowski proposal.

The Peruvian Congress named a new commission to make recommendations on alternate construction plans.  This second commission delivered a meticulous report of the four possible routes that it had explored and evaluated:
 By the gorge of the Rímac River, starting in Lima and proceeding through Matucana, San Mateo and Tarma.
 By the gorge of the Chillón River, from Lima, through Horseman, Yangas, Obrajillo, Casachanca and Carhuacancha
 Along the Chancay River, from Lima, through Chancay, Macas, Huamantanga, Huaillay and Cerro de Pasco
 Along the Lurín River, from Lima, through Lurín, Sisicaya, Tupicocha, San Damián, Tuctucocha, Pumacocha, Basket, Tarma and Jauja.

According to the report, construction of the proposed line was possible but difficult by the Rímac gorge, almost impossible by the Chillón gorge, impossible by the Chancay, but very easy by the Lurín. This last option was the choice of engineer Gerrit Backus, reputed to be one of the most able professionals in the design and construction of railway routes. This third phase lasted until March 1866 when work stopped due to the war with Spain.

In the early phase of construction German-Lithuanian immigrant Felipe Westhoff was sent to find out railway sleeper for the railway. Westhoff arrived this way to Guaitecas Archipelago in Chile where stands of Pilgerodendron uviferum were logged. For the purpose of overseeing the business he founded the settlement of Melinka.

In 1868, Don Diego Masías brought in Henry Meiggs, an American who had been a contractor in both New Jersey and in Chile, who had been working in Chile. The audacious Meiggs, after some negotiation, appeared before the government on 21 September of that year proposing to design and construct a railroad between Lima and Jauja. Meiggs reportedly told the government, "I will place rails there, where the llamas walk." The studies were approved and, with a construction budget that had climbed to 27 million pounds, Meiggs' proposal was accepted. The contract specified that work had to be completed within six years and would be financed by the sale of special bonds, with an annual interest of 6% and amortization of 2% ten years after their sale. The contract was finalized and signed on December 23, 1869.

Construction began in January 1870 with an elaborate ceremony in which the first stone in the Monserrate station in Lima was placed. The work began under the direction of Malinowski, head of the Technical Body, and fellow Polish engineer Edward Jan Habich.

The Callao, Lima & Oroya Railway opened to Chicla by 1878 and reached La Oroya by 1893 and Huancayo in 1908. Both branch and spur have since closed to traffic.

Locomotives 

In its early days, the line relied mainly on steam locomotives imported from the United States, but in the twentieth century the most characteristic type were the "Andes" type (de)  oil-fired 2-8-0s from Beyer, Peacock & Company of Manchester. No. 206 of this type is retained for special workings. 1941 the company owned 47 steam locomotives, 13 railcars, 71 coaches and 978 goods wagons. The first diesels for road operations were delivered from Alco in 1963.

In 2006 FCCA began a program to convert five General Electric C30-7 locomotives and two  GE C39-8 locos to run on compressed natural gas and diesel fuel.

Around 2020–2021, FCCA acquired two former CSX C40-8Ws numbered 7311 and 7374.

Traffic and Tourism 
Traffic includes minerals (mainly from La Oroya), fuels, cement and food products. The route runs through and is famous for the spectacular landscapes of the Peruvian Andes. Although there is now no regular passenger traffic, currently FCCA offers several tourist trips per month from Lima to Huancayo, according to a previously published schedule.

In 2012, a proposal for an urban commuter line within Huancayo city, the Huancayo Metro, was unveiled.

See also 
 Huancayo-Huancavelica Railway
 Rail transport in Peru
 Railway stations in Peru
 Transport in Peru

References

External links 
 Central Railway of Peru - RDC page in English
 Central Railway - Official site - Spanish 
 Map, Callao - Huancavelica 
 Brief historical summary of the railroads in Peru
Ernest Malinowski, the 19th Century Engineer who Defended Peru

Railway companies of Peru